David Socha (born 27 September 1938) is a former soccer referee from the United States. He is best known for supervising two matches in the FIFA World Cup, one in 1982 and one in 1986. The 1982 match between Scotland and New Zealand marked the second ever World Cup match supervised by an American referee after Henry Landauer in 1970. Socha played in the semiprofessional leagues of the United States and two seasons for Portsmouth in the 1950s.

Socha is known to have served as a FIFA referee during the period from 1979 to 1986. His other international events include the 1984 Olympic tournament in Los Angeles and qualifying matches for the 1982 and 1986 World Cups. In the NASL, Socha was the head referee for Soccer Bowl '82, and for game 1 of Soccer Bowl '84. He was also an assistant referee at Soccer Bowl '78.

References

External links
  Profile

1938 births
American soccer referees
FIFA World Cup referees
Living people
1986 FIFA World Cup referees
1982 FIFA World Cup referees
Olympic football referees
Sportspeople from Springfield, Massachusetts
Soccer players from Massachusetts
Portsmouth F.C. players
American soccer players
American expatriate soccer players
Expatriate footballers in England
Association footballers not categorized by position